Mûkûrwe'inî was a former district in Nyeri County, Kenya.

Mûkûrwe'inî was elevated from a division to district status in 2008. The old Mûkûrwe'inî Divisional boundaries remained as the new district's boundaries. Before Kenya's Independence in 1963, Mûkûrwe'inî was referred to as South Tetu Division. It was one of the seven new districts that were created out of the old Nyeri District of Central Province of Kenya. The district headquarters were located at Kiahungu Township which is also the commercial hub for Mûkûrwe'inî.

In 2010, the district was merged with others to form Nyeri County.

Overview
Mûkûrwe'inî District bordered Ndia Constituency, (Kirinyaga County) to the south-east, Mathira and Tetu Constituencies to the North, Othaya Constituency to the West and Kiharu and Mathioya Constituencies and (Muranga County) to the south. Mûkûrwe'inî had the smallest surface of the seven new districts. Mûkûrwe'inî's main frontiers were delianated by four important rivers: Gikira to the West, Gura to the north, Mugono to the south and - the biggest River - River Tana to the east (a major tributary of Kenya's largest river, the Tana River). Mukurweini was divided into seven administrative locations namely Gakindu, Giathugu, Gikondi, Githi, Muhito, Rutune and Thanu. The four electoral wards of Mukurwe-ini constituency are Mukurwe-ini West, Gikondi, Mukurwe-ini Central and Rugi.

Kîahûngû Township
In addition to being the former administrative centre, Kîahûngû Township, in Mûhîto location, is also the seat for the following: Mûkûrwe'inî Sub-County Hospital, the Kenya Commercial Bank (KCB), the Nyeri Farmers Sacco, the Wakulima Dairy, Royal milk, Wakulima Farmers Sacco, a branch of Equity Bank and the Divisional offices for the Nyeri County Council.

Kîahûngû township was established in 1945 soon after the second world war. Four aspiring businessmen built three small stores, some still standing. One of those was the late Erastus Kang'aru Wachira. He went on to build and boost the township's commercial stature before expanding business to Nyeri town proper. He went on to become a major business figure in the old Nyeri and surrounding Districts under the business name of E. K. Wachira and Sons.

Electoral constituencies
The district's administrative boundaries also constituted the Parliamentary electoral area known as Mukurweini Constituency. The electoral area was initially known as South Tetu constituency but was renamed Mukurwe-ini in 1971, and ratified in 1974 when Othaya Division was hived off and made an electoral area. The current member of parliament is Hon. Anthony Kiai alias High Flyer of the High Flyer Publishers. Hon. Kabando wa Kabando who was also the Assistant Minister for Youth & Sports in the Government of Kenya represented the constituency in Parliament in the years 2007-2013 and 2013-2017. Past Members of Parliament (MPs) for the area include Henry Wariithi Mutahi(1964–69,1974–79, and 1979–83), Morris Mwai Koigi(1969–74), Ngumbu Njururi Maiyani(1983–88 and 1988–92) and David Muhika Mutahi(1992–97 and 1997-2002), a prominent farmer and businessman who is the leading light behind the Wakulima Dairy Farmers Association. The immediate former Member of Parliament is Hon. Mutahi Kagwe (2002–2007).who is also the former Minister for Information and Communications.

Education & Health

The major educational institutions located in the former division are South Tetu Girls', Mweru and Kaheti High Schools, Mukurweini (former Kiangoma, and the oldest secondary school in the District built in 1951), Giathugu, Ngoru, Gikondi, Mihuti, Wamutitu, Tambaya, Gathungururu, Ndia-ini, Rutune, Kibutio,Karindi, Ichamara, St. Ann Githunguri, Kihuti, Thangathi, ACK Kiuu and Kaharo Secondary Schools and the Reverend Muhoro School for the Deaf. Notable health facilities in the former division include the Mukurwe-ini Sub-District Hospital, a fully fledged hospital with ward and surgical facilities, the Gikondi Mission Hospital(Nyagaitwa), Karaba, Mweru, Giathugu, Gakindu, Thangathi, Kiuu, Ichamara and Gumba Health Centres and Mihuti Dispensary.

Religion
Most citizens of Mukurweini are Christians. The main churches are the Presbyterian Church of East Africa (PCEA), the Catholic Church, the African Independent Pentecostal Church of Africa (AIPCA, the Anglican Church, the Full Gospel Church, Gospel Outreach Church, Orthodox Church and the New Apostolic Church. Presbyterians and Catholic missions established footholds in Mukurweini since 1920's. traditional African religions have declined in importance especially among the young. The early Christian churches were instrumental in the advancement of education in the area. As a consequence, the area is home to many prominent personalities in private, business and public life in Kenya.

Noteworthy Citizens from Mukurweini, Past and Present 
The most notable personalities from the area are:
 The First Lady of Kenya, The Late H.E. Mrs. Lucy Kibaki
 Nyeri senator Hon Mutahi Kagwe who is a former MP of the area and who also served as Minister for Information and Communications in the Kibaki administration. Hon Kagwe has also served a stint as the Chairman of the Multi Media University of Kenya council,in addition to serving in the boards of Renaissance Capital, TNS Research International(EA), Tellem Public Relations among others.  
 Professor Kamoji Kangaru Wachira, a noted environmentalist, hails from Mukurweini. He was Senior Lecturer, Kenyatta University, when he was detained in 1982 as one of the few early pioneers of Kenya's second liberation. 
 Reverend Timothy Njoya another leading light in Kenya's struggle for democracy and human rights was born in Mukurweini. 
 Hon. Kabando Wa Kabando  the Former MP is from Rutune location. He is the former CEO of the Kenya Hotel Keepers and Caterers Association and Chairman of Nairobi Water and Sewerage Company
Hon. Nicholas Muraguri PS. Ministry of Lands.
 Mr Cyrus Maina (former Provincial Commissioner Nairobi and Coast Province)
 Engineer Richard M. Nderitu- Operations Director KenGen
 The late Erastus Kang'aru Wachira a prominent businessman
 Engineer Anthony Maina Kariuki of NEMA
 Francis Wanganju of Co-operative Bank of Kenya
Award-winning Photojournalist turned activist Boniface Mwangi who hails from Maganjo Village a few kilometres from Kiahung'u township.
 Austine Mutiga Theiya, a Power Generation Professional together with 'Hardstone' Harrison Ngunjiri Maina, a US-based Hip-hop Musician hail from Gakindu Location. Popular secular musician John Njagi also hails from  Gakindu, specifically near Gathungururu Girls' High School. Giathugu location boasts of the late Hon. Ngumbu Njururi, Mr. Ephraim Gathaiya, the CEO Helpage Kenya and former Secretary General of the Kenya Red Cross Society, Mr.Peterson Mwangi Muriithi, National Vice-Chairperson of POSTA Sacco, Capt. Collins Wanderi Munyiri, formerly the Forensic and Litigation Services Manager, KPMG - East Africa and now Deputy Commissioner-Internal Affairs at the Kenya Revenue Authority and Chairman of the Association of Certified Fraud Examiners (ACFE)-Kenya Chapter, Anderson Macharia Gakundi, Finance Manager, Procter & Gamble. Mr. Njagi Gakunju, the CEO, AAR Health Services and Mr. Kihara Muttu, Vice-Chairman of the now defunct Electoral Commission of Kenya.Hon Morris Mwai Koigi Member of Parliament from 1969 to 1974  Githi is home to Mr. Muhika Mutahi, the immediate former MP for Mukurweini , John Mbote Matiri, Bcomm (UoN), CPA(K), a Senior Assistant Manager at ICEA LION Insurance and Francis Maina Ndugire, the Director of Nyeri District co-operatives and former Chairman of the giant, but now defunct Mukurweini Coffee Farmers Co-operative Society. Benedetto Wamutitu was an early member of the nationalist organization - the Kenya African Union (KAU) - alongside Jomo Kenyatta and others in the 1940s. Waruhiu Itote, also known as General China, a Mau Mau leader was from Mukurwe-ini. It is worth noting here that some of the most fierce Mau Mau fighting took place in Mukurweini (especially on the southern borders with Murang'a District between 1953 and 1956). Two clerics are noteworthy for their early religious and educational contributions since the 1930s and 40s in Mukurweni: Reverend James Wanjii Gakunju and Reverend John Kagai (father to Lucy Kibaki). Reverend John Gatu, former Moderator of GA of the PCEA, and the late Archbishop Philip Kiande Wamagu (AIPCA) were born in Mukurweini. Doctor Weston Kariuki is a notable pioneer of Mukurweini District Hospital,he hails from Karundu.Other notable persons are like Jackson Migwi, an alumin of Moi University  pioneer in agency banking in Eldoret,  he hails from Karaba a sub location in Mukurweini.MK Kiminda is a well seasoned,eloquent and reasonable Lawyer from Kangurwe.
John Kuguchia,MP and immediate former assembly speaker for Nyeri County is also a prominent son of Mukurweini.

Agriculture

The people of Mukurweini are mainly farmers and whereas coffee is the main cash crop in the area, most of them practice subsistence farming due to the small size of family holdings. The north-west tip of the District adjacent to Othaya has a few farmers who grow tea. The area is well endowed and has several permanent rivers and numerous springs and streams. The include Rwarai, Gura, Mugono, Thagana, Gikira, Ndurumo, Thiha, Gathera and Ithanji rivers. There is however very little irrigation activity in spite of the dry spells which are now more frequent. The failure to harness these abundant water resources for irrigated farm production is a draw back to District's economic development and food self security. The Division does not experience extreme weather-related disasters beyond occasional droughts. Wajee Nature Park, a bird conservancy, located in Giathugu Location is a good site for all nature and bird watchers. There are a number of falls along Rwarai river with scenic beauty and area sight to behold. The river valleys in Mukurweini are home to many bird species a number of which are preserved at Wajee Nature Park. The camp has a high class restaurant and Boarding facilities which include pitched luxury tents. The lower parts of the Division particularly Rutune and Thanu Locations have sandy loam soils which are not conducive to subsistence farming. A few people are however involved in the growing of tobacco in the area. There is also an upcoming trade in the clay soil that is being used in Nairobi for manufacture of ceramic products

With the establishment of the  milk production has become the major source of income in the area. The dairy formed as a "Self Help " group but now operates as a limited company with over 6,000 farmers who are its shareholders. The dairy provides banking services from its SACCO.

Services

An incipient services industry is developing gradually due to the demand created by relative distance to larger centres. Rudimenatary IT and electronics services are now available for general consumption. With encouragement, younger citizens are modernizing rural peoples' access to technical, property and project management, consultancies, and related services.

Roads

The major roads in the area are the Karatina – Mukurwe-ini – Gakindu – Othaya Road which is tarred. The road branches 2 km before reaching Gakindu to connect Mukurwe-ini to [Nyeri] Town through Kanunga, Tambaya, Muthinga, Gichira and Kagumo College and finally joining the Nyeri - Karatina - Nairobi highway (A2) at Gatitu . The Mukurwe-ini – Mihuti – Giathugu – Mweru – Kabuta – Kigetui-ini- Gakonya road is the main road that connects most of the divisions to the district headquarters. It is being upgraded and its tarring has less than 10 km left on Murang'a side to complete (though a new contractor(china) is currentry on site), thereby linking with Murang'a - Sagana Road (C71). The construction of the road was officially launched in September 2007 by Kenya President, His Execellency Hon. Mwai Kibaki. The road also connects the division to Muranga and Kirinyaga Districts. The tarring of this road will transform the economic fortunes of the people of Mukurwe-ini and has been a hot political issue in the Constituency for a long time. Other notable earth roads include the Gakindu-Gikondi-Karaba-Kabuta road, Gakindu-Gaikundo-Tambaya road, Kiahungu – Gikondi – Karaba road and the Thangathi – Ichamara - Thiha road.

Challenges and Opportunities
Youth employment creation, like elsewhere in Kenya, is still a challenge. Environmental decline especially soil erosion, deforestation, and over-reliance on old cash-cropping with inadequate attention to traditional staple crops for a growing population, land fragmentation,drug abuse and a changing climatic regime - these are also emerging issues.

External links 
Mukurweini Constituency

References

Populated places in Central Province (Kenya)
Former districts of Kenya
Nyeri County